The Armenian Martyrs' Congregational Church is located in Havertown, Pennsylvania. Founded in 1907, it is one of the oldest surviving Armenian Evangelical Churches in the United States and the only such church in Pennsylvania. It is a member of the Armenian Evangelical Union of North America.

The earliest families of the church included the Keuhnelians, Diradourians, Mukhalians, and Hovsepians, and the first search committee was composed of Mihran Kassabian, Dr. Dicran Kabakjian, Aghavni Kabakjian, Roupen Mahjoubian, and Armenag Mahjoubian. The first pastor, Marsovan native Rev. Haig Yardumian, came to the church from the Armenian Evangelical Church in Plovdiv, Bulgaria.

At the church's centennial celebration on December 2, 2007, several previous pastors were honored, including Rev. Hovhannes Karjian, Rev. Jirair Sogomian, Rev. Dr. Peter Doghramji, and Rev. Gary Schongalla-Bowman. Rev. Dr. Soghomon Nuyujukian was named Pastor Emeritus on that occasion.

Until 2018, the pastor was the Rev. L. Nishan Bakalian, who prior to his ministries in Lebanon was married in (1980) and ordained at (1984) AMCC. He began serving in 2007. He resigned his position in 2017 to continue his ministries in Beirut. The church is searching for a new pastor, and the interim pastor is Rev. Edward Livingston.

Pastors
Rev. Haig Yardumian (1907–1925)
Rev. Puzant Levonian (1920–1930)
Rev. Hagop M. Depoyan (1930–1935)
Rev. Haig Adadourian (1936–1937; interim 1948)
Rev. Samuel Rejebian (1937–1948)
Rev. Dr. Dicran Kassouny (1949–1953)
Rev. Puzant Rubyan (1953–1955)
Rev. Dr. Giragos Chopourian (1958–1968)
Rev. Dr. Peter Doghramji (1968–1979)
Rev. Dr. Soghomon Nuyujukian (1980–1988)
Rev. Dr. Eugene Grau (1989–1990)
Rev. Jirair Sogomian (1990–2001)
Rev. Gary Schongalla-Bowman (2001–2007)
Rev. Hovhannes Karjian (2001–2007)
Rev. L. Nishan Bakalian (2007-2017)
Rev. Edward Livingston (interim) (2017-...)

References

External links
 

Armenian Evangelical churches
Haverford Township, Pennsylvania
Churches in Delaware County, Pennsylvania